Nolanea is a genus of small gray to brown pink-spored mushrooms that are mostly saprotrophic and grow on the ground.  The cap can be conical, convex or umbonate in shape, often with a silky top.  The gills have adnexed to adnate attachment (they can also be a little decurrent) and the stalk is fragile and often hollow.  The spores are angular and are flesh colored to pink.  Nolaneas are well known for being difficult to identify.

Nolanea was introduced as a tribus in Elias Magnus Fries' 1821 work Systema Mycologicum. It is sometimes considered a subgenus of the large genus Entoloma rather than a genus in its own right.

Little is known about the edibility of Nolaneas, and some are poisonous.

Species
, Index Fungorum accepts 20 species of Nolanea:
Nolanea avellanea Murrill (1917)
Nolanea claviformis  Largent & Aime (2014)
Nolanea earlei Murrill (1917)
Nolanea furcata Largent & T.W.Henkel (2014)
Nolanea gracilipes Murrill (1917)
Nolanea mimiae Largent & Aime (2014)
Nolanea multiformis Peck (1913)
Nolanea occidentalis Murrill (1917)
Nolanea odorata Largent (1994)
Nolanea radiata (J.E.Lange) P.D.Orton (1960)
Nolanea rava Largent & Aime (2014)
Nolanea rubida Sacc. (1887)
Nolanea scabrinella (Peck) Pomerl. (1980)
Nolanea sinuolata Largent, Aime & T.W.Henkel (2014)
Nolanea suaveolens Peck (1908)
Nolanea subavellanea Murrill (1941)
Nolanea subpicea  Murrill (1917)
Nolanea substaurospora Murrill (1917)
Nolanea substrictia Largent (1994)
Nolanea undulata  Velen. (1921)

References

External links
 The Nolanea Genus

Agaricales genera
Entolomataceae